Iktaba is a Palestinian town located four kilometers Northeast of the city of Tulkarm in the Tulkarm Governorate in the northern West Bank. According to the Palestinian Central Bureau of Statistics (PCBS), the town had a population of 2,665 inhabitants in 2007. Refugees make-up 33% of the entire population in 1997.

History

In 1265, after the Mamluks had defeated the Crusaders, Iktaba (Sabahiya) was mentioned among the estates which Sultan Baibars granted his followers.  The village  was given  to the emir Alam al-Din Tardaj al-Amadi.

Ottoman era
Iktaba  was incorporated into the Ottoman Empire in 1517 with all of  Palestine, and in 1596 it appeared  in the tax registers under the name of Staba,  being in the Nahiya of Qaqun of the Liwa of Nablus.  It had a population of 21 households, all Muslims. The villagers paid a fixed tax rate of 33,3% on various agricultural products, such as  wheat, barley, summer crops, olive trees, goats and/or beehives,  in addition to "occasional revenues" and a press for olive oil or grapes; a total of  4,100  akçe.

In 1870,  the French explorer Victor Guérin noted that village, which he called Astaba, was a  "Small hamlet located on a high hill. Ancient cisterns testify to the existence here of an ancient locality. Fig trees and pomegranates grow around the dwellings."

In 1882,  the PEF's Survey of Western Palestine described it as: "A place to which a certan effendi of Nablus comes down in spring, a sort of 'Azbeh or spring grazing-place for horses"

British Mandate era
In the 1922 census of Palestine conducted by the British Mandate authorities,  Iktaba had a population of 121, all Muslims.  In the 1931 census of Palestine, the combined population of Anabta, Iktaba and Nur ash Shams was 2498; 2,457 Muslims, 34 Christians and 1 Druze living in 502 houses.

In  the 1945 statistics, the combined population of Anabta and Iktaba was 3,120; 3,080 Muslims and 40 Christians, with a total of 15,445 dunams of land  according to an official land and population survey. Of this, a total of 5,908 dunams were plantations and irrigable land, 5,842 were used for cereals, while 84 dunams were built-up (urban) land.

Jordanian era
After the 1948 Arab–Israeli War and the 1949 Armistice Agreements, Iktaba  came under Jordanian rule.

In 1961, the population was  372.

Post-1967
After the Six-Day War in 1967, Iktaba has been under Israeli occupation.

References

Bibliography

External links
Welcome To Iktaba
Survey of Western Palestine, Map 11:    IAA, Wikimedia commons

Tulkarm Governorate
Villages in the West Bank
Municipalities of the State of Palestine